Calderstones Hospital is a mental health facility near to Whalley, Lancashire, England. It is managed by Mersey Care NHS Foundation Trust.

History
The hospital is located on a site known as Clay Fields which previously formed part of the Whalley Abbey estate. It was designed by Henry Littler in the Neo-Georgian style using a dual pavilion layout and, although commissioned, in 1904, as the Sixth Lancashire County Asylum, it actually opened as Queen Mary's Military Hospital in April 1915 during the First World War. Some 56,800 allied servicemen were treated at the hospital between 14 April 1915 and 31 June 1920.

After the war the hospital re-opened as a mental health facility, known as Calderstones Hospital, in June 1921. After the introduction of Care in the Community in the early 1980s, the hospital went into a period of decline and, although its closure has been announced, union leaders have advised that the decision is unlikely to be implemented before 2020. As of June 2019 it was the only NHS hospital in the United Kingdom to specialise in learning disabilities.

See also
Lancaster Moor Hospital, the first Lancashire County Asylum
Prestwich Hospital, the second Lancashire County Asylum
Rainhill Hospital, the third Lancashire County Asylum
Whittingham Hospital, the fourth Lancashire County Asylum
Winwick Hospital, the fifth Lancashire County Asylum

References

NHS hospitals in England
Hospitals in Lancashire
Hospital buildings completed in 1915
Hospitals established in 1915
1915 establishments in England
Psychiatric hospitals in England